This article documents statistics from the Emperor's Cup of the 1994 season.

Overview
There were 32 teams that participated in the contest, and Bellmare Hiratsuka won the championship.

Results

1st round
Sanfrecce Hiroshima 1–0 Cosmo Oil Yokkaichi
Kofu 1–0 Sapporo University
Yokohama Marinos 2–0 Hokuriku Electric Power
NEC Yamagata 2–3 Nagoya Grampus Eight
Yokohama Flügels 1–0 PJM Futures
Senshu University 1–3 Urawa Red Diamonds
Cerezo Osaka 1–0 Komazawa University
Fujieda Blux 1–4 Verdy Kawasaki
Kashima Antlers 0–2 Tokyo Gas
Kokushikan University 1–0 Ritsumeikan University
Bellmare Hiratsuka 5–1 Toa Corporation
Toshiba 0–2 JEF United Ichihara
Júbilo Iwata 1–3 Otsuka Pharmaceutical
Hannan University 1–3 Gamba Osaka
Nippon Denso 1–3 Kyoto Purple Sanga
Kawasaki Steel 2–1 Shimizu S-Pulse

2nd round
Sanfrecce Hiroshima 2–0 Kofu
Yokohama Marinos 1–0 Nagoya Grampus Eight
Yokohama Flügels 0–2 Urawa Red Diamonds
Cerezo Osaka 1–0 Verdy Kawasaki
Tokyo Gas 1–0 Kokushikan University
Bellmare Hiratsuka 2–1 JEF United Ichihara
Otsuka Pharmaceutical 0–5 Gamba Osaka
Kyoto Purple Sanga 3–1 Kawasaki Steel

Quarterfinals
Sanfrecce Hiroshima 0–3 Yokohama Marinos
Urawa Red Diamonds 0–1 Cerezo Osaka
Tokyo Gas 1–2 Bellmare Hiratsuka
Gamba Osaka 2–0 Kyoto Purple Sanga

Semifinals
Yokohama Marinos 1–2 Cerezo Osaka
Bellmare Hiratsuka 3–2 Gamba Osaka

Final

Cerezo Osaka 0–2 Bellmare Hiratsuka
Bellmare Hiratsuka won the championship.

References
 NHK

Emperor's Cup
Emperor's Cup
1995 in Japanese football